Turbanella is a genus of gastrotrichs belonging to the family Turbanellidae.

The genus has almost cosmopolitan distribution.

Species

Species:

Turbanella ambronensis 
Turbanella aminensis 
Turbanella amphiatlantica

References

Gastrotricha